Panta n' antamonoume (English: We'll Always Be Meeting) is a Greek variety music television series airs on N1 on 10 May 2014 every Saturday at 8.15pm, It's hosted by Thanasis Alevras and Rika Vagiani.

New Hellenic Radio, Internet and Television original programming
Greek variety television series
Greek music television series
2014 Greek television series debuts
2015 Greek television series endings
2010s Greek television series